The Poznań Marathon is an annual road-based marathon hosted by Poznań, Poland, since 2000.  It was categorized as a Bronze Label Road Race by the International Association of Athletics Federations and is a member of the Association of International Marathons and Distance Races.

The marathon is one of five in the Crown of Polish Marathons program, along with the Dębno Marathon, Kraków, Warsaw, and Wrocław Marathon.

History 

A total of 763 people finished the race, which was won by Polish runners Andrzej Krzyścin and Dorota Gruca, with finish times of 2:17:23 and 2:37:22, respectively.

In 2012, the winner of the men's race Edwin Kosgei Yator of Kenya (who won the race with the time 2:16:16) failed anti-doping tests and as a consequence was stripped of the title. The winner of the 2012 edition of Poznań Marathon was another Kenyan, Edwin Kirui.

In 2013, the Poznań Marathon was finished by a total of 5,678 participants, which made it the second largest marathon in the country behind only the Warsaw Marathon.

Among notable participants of the Poznań Marathon are politicians including Mayors of Poznań who run in the marathon traditionally wearing the number one.

The 2020 edition of the race was postponed to 2021 before being cancelled due to the coronavirus pandemic, with all registrants receiving a refund.

Winners 
Key:

By country

Notes

See also 
Sport in Poland

References

External links 
 Official website

2000 establishments in Poland
Annual sporting events in Poland
Autumn events in Poland
Marathons in Poland
October sporting events
Recurring sporting events established in 2000
Sport in Poznań